Eric Sams (3 May 1926 – 13 September 2004) was a British musicologist and Shakespeare scholar.

Life
Born in London, Sams was raised in Essex. His early brilliance in school (Westcliff High School for Boys) earned him a scholarship to Corpus Christi College, Cambridge, at the age of sixteen. His lifelong passion for puzzles and ciphers stood him in good stead in his wartime service in British Intelligence (1944–47). After the war he read Modern Languages at Cambridge (French and German), 1947–50; upon graduation he entered the Civil Service. In 1952 he married Enid Tidmarsh (died 2002), a pianist. Their elder son, Richard, is a Japanese scholar and chess master working in Tokyo; their younger son Jeremy Sams is a composer, lyricist, playwright, and theatre director.

Musicology
In music, Sams wrote on and studied a range of subjects and genres, though his specialty was German lieder. He wrote volumes on the songs of Robert Schumann,  Johannes Brahms, and Hugo Wolf. His theory of song-motifs is one of the 20th century's most important contributions to the research in the field of German song studies. From 1965 to 1980 he was a regular contributor to The Musical Times with essays and reviews. Most notably, he wrote on Schumann's and Brahms's ciphers and music codes (the "Clara-Theme", among others), on Elgar's Enigma and on Schubert's and Schumann's pathologies. His New Grove articles include Schubert and Schumann work-list, "Wolf" and Wolf work-list, "Mörike", "Hanslick" and "Musical Cryptography" (also in Grove 6). He reviewed opera performance for the New Statesman, 1976–78 and wrote record reviews for Gramophone 1976–78.

Shakespeare

In the field of Shakespeare studies, Sams specialised in the early phases of Shakespeare's career. He published over a hundred papers on the subject and wrote two books, The Real Shakespeare: Retrieving the Early Years, 1564–1594 (New Haven & London 1995) and The Real Shakespeare: Retrieving the Later Years, 1594–1616 (unfinished at the time of Sams' death, an edited text being published as an e-book by the Centro Studi "Eric Sams", 2008) . Building on the work of W. J. Courthope, Hardin Craig, E. B. Everitt, Seymour Pitcher and others, Sams' thesis was that "Shakespeare was an early starter who rewrote nobody's plays but his own", and that the young playwright "may have been a master of structure before he was a master of language". Far from being a plagiarist, Shakespeare found accusations of plagiarism (e.g. Greene's "beautified with our feathers") offensive (Sonnets 30, 112). Trusting the early 'biographical' sources John Aubrey and Nicholas Rowe, Sams re-assessed Shakespeare's early and 'missing' years, and argued through detailed textual analysis that Shakespeare began writing plays from the mid-1580s, in a style not now recognisably Shakespearean. In full critical editions of the two plays, he defended the attributions of the anonymous Edmund Ironside and Edward III to Shakespeare, and in an appendix argued that the "powerful drama" Thomas of Woodstock, or The first Part of the Reign of King Richard II was also Shakespeare's work. The so-called 'Source Plays' and 'Derivative Plays' (The Taming of a Shrew, The Troublesome Reign of King John, etc.), and the so-called 'Bad Quartos', are (printers' errors aside) his own first versions of famous later plays. As many of the Quarto title-pages proclaim, Shakespeare was an assiduous reviser of his own work, rewriting, enlarging and emending to the end of his life. He "struck the second heat / upon the Muses' anvil," as Ben Jonson put it in the Folio verse tribute. Sams dissented from 20th-century orthodoxy, arguing strongly against the concept of memorial reconstruction by amnesiac actors, which he called a "wrong-headed" theory. "Authorial revision of early plays is the only rational alternative." The pirated copies referred to in the preamble to the Folio were the 1619 quartos, mostly already superseded plays, for "Shakespeare was disposed to release his own popular early version[s] for acting and printing because his own masterly revision[s] would soon be forthcoming". Sams believed that Shakespeare in his retirement was revising his oeuvre "for definitive publication". The "apprentice plays" which had been reworked were naturally omitted from the Folio. Sams also rejected 20th-century orthodoxy on Shakespeare's collaboration: with the exception of Sir Thomas More, Two Noble Kinsmen and Henry VIII, the plays were solely his, though many were only partly revised. By Sams' authorship- and dating-arguments, Shakespeare wrote not only the earliest "modern" chronicle play, The Troublesome Reign, c. 1588, but also "the earliest known modern comedy and tragedy", A Shrew and the Ur-Hamlet (substantially = the 1603 Quarto).

 Sams also argued, more briefly, that "there is some evidence of Shakespearean authorship of A Pleasant Commodie of Fair Em the Millers Daughter, with the loue of William the Conqueror, written before 1586, and of The Lamentable Tragedie of Locrine written mid-1580s and "newly set foorth, ouerseene and corrected, by W.S." in 1595.

Critical reaction to Sams' 1995 book was largely favourable. "Much of what is postulated for [Shakespeare's] boyhood years seems convincing," wrote Jonathan Keates, "including a background in Catholic recusancy and a schooling interrupted by family financial crisis. Neither is the idea of the poet as a reviser of his own early work implausible, and Sams is a persuasive salesman of his big idea that so-called 'bad quartos' represent valuable first thoughts." "His unwillingness to collude with academics against actors," wrote Professor Stephen Logan, "springs from a deep respect for the past. He would sooner trust eyewitness testimony, however informal, than the authority of [the Shakespeare Establishment] consensus."

Selected works

The Songs of Hugo Wolf, 1961 (rev. 1983).
The Songs of Robert Schumann, 1969 (rev. 1993).
Brahms Songs, 1972 (rev. 2000)
Shakespeare's Lost Play, Edmund Ironside, 1986.
The Real Shakespeare: Retrieving the Early years, 1564-1594, 1995.
Shakespeare's Edward III: An Early Play Restored to the Canon, 1996.
The Songs of Johannes Brahms, 2000.
Essays and reviews on music, Shakespeare, and cryptography, 1966-1998, online edition in the web-pages of the Centro Studi "Eric Sams"
The Real Shakespeare II: Retrieving the Later Years, 1594-1616, 2008, e-book published by the Centro Studi "Eric Sams"
 Opere complete in 15 volumi. Collana diretta da Erik Battaglia e Valentina Valente. Traduzione e cura di Erik Battaglia. Asti, Analogon Edizioni, 2007- (Vol.1, Il Tema di Clara, 2007; Vol.2, Variazioni con Enigma svelato, 2008; Vol.3, Introduzione ai Lieder di Brahms, 2008; Vol.4, Hugo Wolf. Introduzione alla vita e alle opere, 2008; Vol.5, Tabù or not tabù, 2010; Vol.6, I Lieder di Robert Schumann, 2010; Vol.7, Robert Schumann, Jean Paul: Papillons, with an Introduction and a Commentary by Eric Sams, 2010; Vol. 8, Musica e codici cifrati, 2011; Vol. 9, I Lieder di Hugo Wolf, 2011; Vol. 10, I Lieder di Johannes Brahms, 2013; Vol. 11, L'opera lirica è perfidia e passione per paranoici, 2015)

References

Gerald Moore, Preface to The Songs of Hugo Wolf, see above.
id., Preface to The Songs of Robert Schumann, see above.
Graham Johnson, Preface to The Songs of Johannes Brahms, see above.
Anthony Burgess, "Cygnet of Avon", The Observer, February 2, 1986, p. 29 
Erik Battaglia, "The application of thought to musicology. A Tribute to Eric Sams ", in SSUSA (Schubert Society of the USA) Newsletter, Vol. 3, n.l 1, 2005; reprinted in The Lyrica, newsletter published by the Lyrica Society for Word-Music Relations, Harvard, n. 26, Spring 2005.
Andrew Lamb, "Elgar, Shakespeare, and A Little Light Music", Essay for the Centro Studi Eric Sams, 2007
Ron Rosenbaum, "A visit with an avenging angel" in The Shakespeare Wars, 2008, pp. 66–75. 
Francis J. Sypher, "Two Essays on Eric Sams", written for the Centro Studi Eric Sams, 2009 and 2011 (also a numbered pamphlet edition, New York 2009-2011)

Notes

External links
 "Centro Studi Eric Sams" Online Publication of all his essays and reviews on music, on Shakespeare, on cryptography (with letters, lectures and interviews)
 Obituaries from The Independent, The Guardian, The Times

People educated at Westcliff High School for Boys
Alumni of Corpus Christi College, Cambridge
Shakespearean scholars
1926 births
2004 deaths
20th-century British musicologists
Secret Intelligence Service personnel
British people of World War II
Schumann scholars
Brahms scholars